Cristina Lara Pérez (born 5 August 1995) is a Spanish sprinter. She won a gold medal in the 4 × 100 metres relay at the 2017 European U23 Championships.

International competitions

Personal bests
Outdoor
100 metres – 11.40 (+1.9 m/s, Barcelona 2017)
200 metres – 23.22 (+0.2 m/s, Ciudad Real 2017)

Indoor
60 metres – 7.36 (Salamanca 2017)
200 metres – 23.78 (Madrid 2016)

References

1995 births
Living people
Spanish female sprinters
Athletes from Barcelona
Mediterranean Games silver medalists for Spain
Mediterranean Games medalists in athletics
Athletes (track and field) at the 2018 Mediterranean Games
European Games competitors for Spain
Athletes (track and field) at the 2019 European Games